"Love Is Here and Now You're Gone" is a 1967 song recorded by the Supremes for the Motown label.

Written and composed by Motown's main production team Holland–Dozier–Holland, it became the second consecutive number-one pop single from the Supremes' album The Supremes Sing Holland–Dozier–Holland  and the group's ninth overall chart-topper in the United States on Billboard Hot 100, peaking March 1967.

Background

History
The song, which depicts a relationship in the beginning stages of breakup ("You persuaded me to love you/And I did/But instead of tenderness/I found heartache instead"), features several spoken sections from lead singer Diana Ross, who delivers her dialogue in a dramatic, emotive voice. Matching the song's drama influences is an instrumental track, featuring a prominent harpsichord and strings, which recalls both a Hollywood film score and The Left Banke's recently popularized "Baroque rock."

Primarily recorded in Los Angeles, California, thousands of miles away from Motown's regular Hitsville U.S.A. recording studio, "Love Is Here And Now You're Gone" was the #1 song on the U.S. Billboard Hot 100 for one week, from March 5 to March 11, 1967, becoming the group's ninth number-one single. The single was also the group's sixth number one on the R&B charts. The girl group performed the hit record on NBC's The Andy Williams Show on Sunday, January 22, 1967, going to number one seven weeks later. Lyricist Eddie Holland names "Love is Here" as his favorite Supremes song.

Cash Box said the single is a "bright, rhythmic, pulsating Motown-sound excursion" in which the Supremes are "at the top of their form."

Personnel
 Lead vocals by Diana Ross
 Backing vocals by Florence Ballard and Mary Wilson
 Instrumentation and additional background vocals by Los Angeles area studio musicians
 Written by Brian Holland, Lamont Dozier, and Eddie Holland
 Produced by Brian Holland and Lamont Dozier
 Arranged by Gene Page

Chart history

Weekly charts

Year-end charts

Certifications

Cover versions
Michael Jackson later covered "Love Is Here And Now You're Gone" for his solo debut album, Got to Be There. On the 45 versions, it was the B-side of his number two smash, "Rockin' Robin". It also featured on the 'Jackson And The Beanstalk' episode on the Jackson 5 cartoon series in 1972.

Tami Lynn covered this song on her debut album, Love Is Here and Now You're Gone in 1972.

Phil Collins included this song on his 2010 album of soul covers, Going Back.

See also
List of Hot 100 number-one singles of 1967 (U.S.)

References

External links
 

The Supremes songs
Michael Jackson songs
Billboard Hot 100 number-one singles
Cashbox number-one singles
RPM Top Singles number-one singles
1967 singles
Songs written by Holland–Dozier–Holland
Motown singles
1967 songs
Song recordings produced by Brian Holland
Song recordings produced by Lamont Dozier
Songs about heartache
Songs about loneliness